Robert Ashe  may refer to:

Arthur Robert Ashe (1943–1993), American tennis player
Robert Hoadley Ashe (1751–1826), English divine
Robert Ashe (civil servant) (1872–1911), Collector and District Magistrate in India, assassinated in 1911

See also
Robert Ash (disambiguation)